Xenorhabdus beddingii  is a bacterium from the genus of Xenorhabdus which has been isolated from the nematode genus Steinernema in Australia and Queensland.

References

Further reading

External links
Type strain of Xenorhabdus beddingii at BacDive -  the Bacterial Diversity Metadatabase

Bacteria described in 1993